91.9 Air1 Radio (DWCH 91.9 MHz) is an FM station owned by Iddes Broadcast Group and operated by Air1 Global Advertising Corporation. Its studios are located at the 4th floor, Lucy Bldg., Brgy. Alangilan, Batangas City, and its transmitter is located at Mt. Banoy, Brgy. Talumpok East, Batangas City. The frequency is formerly owned by Radio Mindanao Network.

References

External links
 Air1 Radio FB Page

Radio stations in Batangas
Radio stations established in 2011